The 1974 Eastern Illinois Panthers football team represented as an independent Eastern Illinois University during the 1974 NCAA Division II football season. The Panthers played their home games at O'Brien Stadium in Charleston, Illinois.

Schedule

References

Eastern Illinois
Eastern Illinois Panthers football seasons
Eastern Illinois Panthers football